Satarupa may refer to:

People 
 Satarupa Pyne, Indian model and actress
 Satarupa Sanyal, Indian film director, producer, author, poet

Species 
 Satarupa, genus of spread-winged skippers in the family Hesperiidae